Chan Mahi is a Pakistani Punjabi film released on 2 November 1956. The film was directed by Anwar Kamal Pasha and it became a popular musical film in 1956 with many super-hit film songs.

Producer and director Anwar Kamal Pasha introduced actress Bahar Begum in this film who later became a well-known film actress both in Punjabi and Urdu language films. She stayed very active in the 1950s to 1980s period in the Pakistan film industry.

Cast 

 Bahar Begum
 Asif Jah
 Aslam Pervaiz
 Nighat Sultana
 M. Ismail

Some super-hit songs
 "Bundey Chaandi Dey Sonay Di Nath Ley Ke, Aaja Ho Belia" Sung by Zubaida Khanum, lyrics by Tufail Hoshiarpuri, and music by Rasheed Attre
 "Ni Chithhiey Sajana Diye, Teinun Ghutt Ghutt Japhian Panwaan, Tey Sadaqay Janwaan" Sung by Zubaida Khanum, lyrics by
 Tufail Hoshiarpuri and music by Rasheed Attre
 "Pheir Layyan Chann Mahi Akhhian, Dubb Gaey Aas Dey Taaray" Sung by Zubaida Khanum, lyrics by Tufail Hoshiarpuri and music by Rasheed Attre
 "Mahi Maut Da Suneha Ditta Kahll Wey, Ais Dunia Taun Duur Dila Chall Wey" Sung by Zubaida Khanum, lyrics by Tufail Hoshiarpuri and music by Rasheed Attre

References

External links
 Chan Mahi - IMDB.com

Punjabi-language Pakistani films
1956 films
Pakistani black-and-white films
1950s Punjabi-language films
Films scored by Rashid Attre